Kenny de Schepper was the defending champion, but lost in the quarterfinals.
The previous year's runner-up Norbert Gombos won the title, defeating Benoît Paire in the final, 6–1, 7–6(7–4).

Seeds

Draw

Finals

Top half

Bottom half

References
 Main Draw
 Qualifying Draw

Challenger La Manche - Singles